George H. Capron (July 27, 1886 – October 1972) was an American football and baseball player.  

Capron played football and baseball for the University of Minnesota from 1907 to 1908.  In 1907, the Minnesota football team scored only 55 points, and "Capron accounted for 44 of them with dropkicked field goals at four points each."  He was selected as a third-team All-American by Walter Camp at the end of the 1907 season. 

Late in his career at the University of Minnesota, Capron became involved in a controversy over his eligibility when reports surfaced that he had played professional baseball under a false name. Capron later admitted that he played baseball under the name Robb at Meridian, Mississippi in 1908 and at Mattoon, Illinois in 1907.  From 1909 to 1910, Capron played two years of professional baseball in the Northwestern League. In 1909, he played 155 games as the left fielder for the Seattle Turks, compiling 164 hits, 27 doubles, 8 triples, 15 home runs, and a .275 batting average.  In 1910, he played 35 games for the Vancouver Beavers though his batting average dropped to .207.  

He also played professional football in the early days of the professional game in the 1910s.  He resided in Fresno, California in his later years.

See also
1907 College Football All-America Team

References

Minnesota Golden Gophers football players
Seattle Turks players
1886 births
1972 deaths
American football drop kickers
American football halfbacks